Sjukdom (English: Sickness) is the fourth and final album by Swedish metal band Lifelover.  It was written entirely by band member Jonas "B" Bergqvist, who also played all instruments on it (as well as contributed occasional vocals), and it was released on 14 February 2011 by Prophecy Productions.  A limited edition vinyl and CD boxset was also released. The album is noted for its
more ‘gritty’ sound compared to other Lifelover records–a couple songs notably feature an apparent groovy death metal influence, which was a style never previously explored by the band.

Seven months after Sjukdom was released (September 2011), Bergqvist would be found dead from an accidental prescription overdose. Lifelover would then break up as a direct result of his death.

Track listing

Personnel

Lifelover
 – lead vocals, lyrics
 B – guitars, bass, drum machine, piano, vocals, lyrics
 LR – vocals (on track 13 & 14), lyrics
 1853 – lyrics

Other personnel
 P.G. (Reaktor 4) – vocals (on track 3)
 Gok – music, lyrics (on track 9)

2011 albums
Lifelover albums